Forked River is an unincorporated community and census-designated place (CDP) located within Lacey Township, in Ocean County,  in the U.S. state of New Jersey. As of the 2020 United States census, the CDP's population was 5,274, an increase of 30 (+0.6%) from the 5,244 enumerated at the 2010 census, which in turn reflected an increase of 330 (+6.7%) from the 4.914 counted at the 2000 census.

Many Ocean County residents commonly refer to all of Lacey Township as Forked River with the first word pronounced with two syllables. Pronouncing the first word with one syllable is a sign of a new resident or outsider.

Geography
According to the U.S. Census Bureau, the CDP had a total area of 10.336 square miles (26.768 km2), including 2.723 square miles (7.052 km2) of land and 7.613 square miles (19.717 km2) of water (73.66%).

Forked River is located on US Route 9 south of Toms River.  The community of Lanoka Harbor is directly north of Forked River, Bamber Lake is to the west, Barnegat is to the southwest, and Waretown is to the south.

Forked River is also the name of a nearby river that empties into Barnegat Bay.

Demographics

Census 2010

Census 2000
As of the 2000 United States census there were 4,914 people, 1,927 households, and 1,383 families residing in the CDP. The population density was 656.5/km2 (1,700.3/mi2). There were 2,468 housing units at an average density of 329.7/km2 (853.9/mi2). The racial makeup of the CDP was 97.37% White, 0.73% African American, 0.22% Native American, 0.33% Asian, 0.83% from other races, and 0.51% from two or more races. Hispanic or Latino of any race were 3.38% of the population.

There were 1,927 households, out of which 30.2% had children under the age of 18 living with them, 58.8% were married couples living together, 9.3% had a female householder with no husband present, and 28.2% were non-families. 22.6% of all households were made up of individuals, and 9.3% had someone living alone who was 65 years of age or older. The average household size was 2.54 and the average family size was 2.98.

In the CDP the population was spread out, with 24.0% under the age of 18, 6.2% from 18 to 24, 29.2% from 25 to 44, 25.3% from 45 to 64, and 15.4% who were 65 years of age or older. The median age was 39 years. For every 100 females, there were 97.5 males. For every 100 females age 18 and over, there were 94.2 males.

The median income for a household in the CDP was $55,433, and the median income for a family was $59,830. Males had a median income of $46,179 versus $30,987 for females. The per capita income for the CDP was $25,696. About 6.3% of families and 7.6% of the population were below the poverty line, including 14.9% of those under age 18 and 6.1% of those age 65 or over.

Education
Lacey Township School District is the local school district.

St. Mary Academy near Manahawkin CDP, a K-8 school of the Roman Catholic Diocese of Trenton, is in the area. From 1997, until 2019 it operated as All Saints Regional Catholic School and was collectively managed by five churches, with one being St. Pius X Church, in Lacey Township and  adjacent to the Forked River CDP. In 2019 St. Mary Church in Barnegat took entire control of the school, which remained on the same Manahawkin campus, and changed its name. The other churches no longer operate the school but still may send students there.

In the news
On October 11, 1989, three aides of New York business mogul Donald Trump were killed in a helicopter crash near the Garden State Parkway in Forked River. Five people, including three high-level executives of Trump's three casinos in Atlantic City were killed when their helicopter crashed in pine woodlands.

On June 6, 1997, Melissa Drexler, known as The Prom Mom, delivered a baby in a restroom stall at her Lacey Township High School prom, and threw the body in the trash before returning to the dance. She pleaded guilty to aggravated manslaughter, and was sentenced to fifteen years' imprisonment. After serving nearly 37 months, she was released on parole.

Transportation

NJ Transit provides bus service to Atlantic City on the 559 bus route. Academy Bus provided bus service to Jersey City and New York City on the Parkway Express. Local bus service is provided by Ocean Ride. Forked River is served by U.S. Route 9 and exit 74 of the Garden State Parkway.

Notable people

People who were born in, residents of, or otherwise closely associated with Forked River include:
 Christopher J. Connors (born 1956), represents the 9th legislative district in the New Jersey General Assembly.
 Melissa Drexler (born 1978), Prom Mom.
 Chris Fleming (born 1970), basketball player and coach.
 "Irish" Teddy Mann (born 1951), former middleweight boxing contender and author of Fighting For Redemption: The "Irish" Teddy Mann Story.
 Scott Palguta (born 1982), Head Men's Soccer Coach at Colorado College who had played with the Colorado Rapids of Major League Soccer.
 Rhett Titus (born 1987), professional wrestler.

References

Census-designated places in Ocean County, New Jersey
Lacey Township, New Jersey
Populated places in the Pine Barrens (New Jersey)